Heikki Juhani Alaranta (born 20 July 1948 in Merijärvi) is a Finnish Lutheran clergyman and politician. He was a member of the Parliament of Finland from 1983 to 1999, representing the Centre Party.

References

1948 births
Living people
People from Merijärvi
20th-century Finnish Lutheran clergy
Centre Party (Finland) politicians
Members of the Parliament of Finland (1983–87)
Members of the Parliament of Finland (1987–91)
Members of the Parliament of Finland (1991–95)
Members of the Parliament of Finland (1995–99)
University of Helsinki alumni
21st-century Finnish Lutheran clergy